Merkaz Shapira (lit: Shapira Center) is a religious village in the Southern District of Israel. Located in the southern Shephelah between Kiryat Malakhi and Ashkelon, it falls under the jurisdiction of Shafir Regional Council.

History
The village was founded in the beginning of the 1950s as the Shafir Regional Center, a group of regional educational facilities on land belonging to the depopulated Palestinian village of Al-Sawafir al-Gharbiyya. In 1958, it was merged with the farm Dganim, which was abandoned due to failure. The name was changed in October 1957 to Merkaz Shapira, after the wounded Knesset member Moshe Shapira, but due to legal problems, it was only changed officially in 1970.

Merkaz Shapira contains the Or Etzion yeshiva which consists of both a high school and post-high school religious learning institutions (on its eastern end) and an elementary and middle school for itself and nearby villages (Azrikam, Ein Tzurim, Masu'ot Yitzhak, Shafir, Shtulim and Zerahia). The offices of the Shafir Regional Council are also located within the village. Merkaz Shapira has five synagogues - Ohel Yitzhak, The Jerusalemite Synagogue, The Moroccan Synagogue, the Ashkenazi Ashmoret Avraham and the Yemenite Ahuzat Shalom.

Notable residents
Haim Drukman

References

Villages in Israel
Religious Israeli communities
Populated places in Southern District (Israel)
Populated places established in 1948
1948 establishments in Israel